Ronald Roberts (11 December 1922 – 19 June 2012) was a British swimmer. He competed at the 1952 Summer Olympics and the 1956 Summer Olympics.

He also represented England at the 1954 British Empire and Commonwealth Games in Vancouver, Canada. He won the 1953 and 1955 ASA National Championship 110 yards freestyle titles and the 1953 ASA National Championship 220 yards freestyle title.

References

1922 births
2012 deaths
British male swimmers
Olympic swimmers of Great Britain
Swimmers at the 1952 Summer Olympics
Swimmers at the 1956 Summer Olympics
Sportspeople from Lincolnshire
Swimmers at the 1954 British Empire and Commonwealth Games
Commonwealth Games competitors for England